Hensley is an English surname. Notable people with the surname include: 
 Andre Hensley, leader of the Universal Life Church
 Casey Hensley, American musician and record producer
 Cindy Hensley McCain, American businesswoman, philanthropist, and humanitarian, and the widow of John McCain
 Clay Hensley, American former professional baseball pitcher
 David Hensley, American baseball player
 Dick Hensley, American former professional football player
 George Went Hensley, American Pentecostal minister
 Jack Hensley, American hostage murdered by insurgents in Iraq in 2004
Jaymi Hensley, English singer (Union J)
 Jim Hensley, American businessman
 Jimmy Hensley, American race driver
 John Hensley, American actor
 Jon Hensley, American actor, singer and songwriter
 Joe L. Hensley, American lawyer and author
 Joseph Hensley, Canadian politician
 Kelley Menighan Hensley, American actress
 Ken Hensley, English musician and producer
 Kirby J. Hensley, American founder of the Universal Life Church
 Lisa Hensley (microbiologist), American microbiologist
 Lisa Hensley (actress), Australian actress
 Pamela Hensley, American actress and author
 Shuler Hensley, American singer and actor
 Patsy Cline (born Virginia Patterson Hensley; 1932–1963), American singer